The 2012 season was Rosenborg's 22nd consecutive year in Tippeligaen, and their 45th season in the top flight of Norwegian football. It was their second and final season with Jan Jönsson as manager. They participated in the Tippeligaen, finishing 3rd. They also took part in the 2012 Norwegian Football Cup, getting eliminated by Molde at the Fourth Round stage and the 2012–13 UEFA Europa League, which they entered at the First qualifying round stage and were eliminated at the group stage.

Squad

Transfers

Winter

In:

 
 

Out:

Summer

In:

 

 
 

Out:

Competitions

Tippeligaen

Results summary

Results by round

Results

Table

Norwegian Cup

Europa League

Qualifying phase

Group stage

Notes
Note 1: Rapid Wien played their home matches at Ernst-Happel-Stadion, Vienna instead of their regular stadium, Gerhard-Hanappi-Stadion, Vienna.
Note 2: The Rapid Wien v Rosenborg match was played behind closed doors due to the punishment handed to Rapid Wien by UEFA following incidents at their play-off round first leg against PAOK on 23 August 2012.
Note 3: Ordabasy played their home match at Central Stadium, Almaty instead of their regular stadium, Kazhimukan Munaitpasov Stadium, Shymkent.

Squad statistics

Appearances and goals

|-
|colspan="14"|Players away from Rosenborg on loan:

|-
|colspan="14"|Players who left Rosenborg during the season:

|}

Goal scorers

Disciplinary record

References

2012
Rosenborg